Aria Aber (born 1991) is a poet and writer based in Oakland, California.

Life
Aber was raised in Germany, where she was born to Afghan refugees. Her poems have appeared in The New Yorker, New Republic, Kenyon Review.

Aber has received awards and fellowships from Kundiman, the Wisconsin Institute of Creative Writing, and the Whiting Foundation. Aber was the spring 2020 Li Shen Visiting Writer at Mills College. She is currently a Stegner Fellow in Poetry at Stanford University for 2020-2022.

Work and publications  
Aber’s first full-length collection Hard Damage, which won the Prairie Schooner Book Prize in Poetry, was published in September 2019 by University of Nebraska Press.

In a review at the Los Angeles Review of Books, Claire Schwartz wrote, "Hard Damage — which elaborates a constellation of beauty and terror between Afghanistan, Germany, and the United States — is vexed by the meanings of bringing across."

In an interview at The Yale Review, Aber has stated, "Especially the English language is political, because it has operated as a colonizing force in many places around the world, and changed global indigenous languages forever, if not completely eradicated them. If poetry is “the soul of a nation” (this quote is attributed to T.S. Eliot, though I cannot fact-check the source), and our nation is an empire actively participating in displacement and warfare, it feels only natural to me that these topics surface in poetry."

Bibliography

Poetry
 Hard Damage (2019)

References

External links
 Official website
 Pádraig Ó Tuama reads & discusses Aria Aber’s poem The Only Cab Service of Farmington, Maine

Living people
Writers from Oakland, California
American writers of Afghan descent
1991 births
Stegner Fellows
German women poets
American women poets
21st-century American poets
21st-century American women writers
21st-century German poets
21st-century German women writers
German emigrants to the United States
The New Yorker people